Patrik Aimo Oksanen (born 13 March 1973) is a Swedish journalist and writer. He formerly served as the Europe correspondent of Sveriges Television. Since 2015 he hosts the podcast series Podd72 on security policy, defense and information warfare. He was elected as a fellow of the Royal Swedish Academy of War Sciences in 2020.

Referanser

Swedish journalists
Members of the Royal Swedish Academy of War Sciences
1973 births
Sveriges Television
Living people